Turle is a surname. Notable people with the surname include:

Frederica J. Turle (1880–?), English writer
James Turle (1802–1882), English classical organist and composer
Henry Frederic Turle (1835–1883), English journalist

See also
Turle knot, fishing knot
Turley